Regina Gorman is a camogie player, winner of a Soaring Star award in 2010, a Nancy Murray Cup, a Leinster and an All-Ireland Junior Title with Kildare in 2010. At underage level Regina played all her camogie in the forwards but was selected to play full back for the successful 2010 championship campaign. It was in the full-back position that she received her Soaring Star award. Regina also lined out for the Irish Shinty team which defeated Scotland  in October 2010. Regina has also played for Leinster in the past in the inter provincial Gael Linn competitions. She alternates between playing in the forwards and defence for her club Cappagh.

Family background
Regina's sister Breeda also played for Kildare in 2011. Reginas' older sisters Maeve and Eithne have also lined out for Kildare in the past.

reaction
In the words of County Manager Tom O'Mahoney "Regina has the unique ability of inspirational play while at the same time maintaining a level of calmness that radiates throughout the team. She has been consistent throughout the year, and has produced the goods on all the big days".

References

External links
 Camogie.ie Official Camogie Association Website

Living people
Kildare camogie players
Year of birth missing (living people)